This is a list of records and statistics in the Tour de France, road cycling's premier competitive event.

One rider has been King of the Mountains, won the combination classification, combativity award, the points competition, and the Tour in the same year - Eddy Merckx in 1969, which was also the first year he participated. Had the young riders classification, which replaced the combination classification, existed at the time, Merckx would have won that jersey too. 

The only rider to approach the feat of winning the green, polka dot and yellow jersey in the same Tour was Bernard Hinault in 1979, where he won the race and the points classification, but finished 2nd in the mountains competition. After Merckx in 1972 no other rider would win three distinctive jerseys in a single Tour until Tadej Pogačar in 2020, a feat he repeated the following year.

Twice the Tour was won by a racer who never wore the yellow jersey until the race was over. In 1947, Jean Robic overturned a three-minute deficit on a 257 km final stage into Paris.  In 1968, Jan Janssen of the Netherlands secured his win in the individual time trial on the last day.

In addition to 1947 and 1968, in 1989 Greg LeMond overcame a +:50 deficit to Laurent Fignon on the last day of the race in Paris to win the race on the final day, however Lemond had worn the yellow jersey earlier in the race. This was the final time the last stage in Paris was held as an individual time trial.

The Tour has been won four times by a racer who led the general classification on the first stage and held the lead all the way to Paris. Maurice Garin did it during the Tour's first edition, 1903; he repeated the feat the next year, but the results were nullified in response to widespread cheating. Ottavio Bottecchia completed a GC start-to-finish sweep in 1924. In 1928, Nicolas Frantz also led the GC for the entire race, and the final podium was made up of three riders from his Alcyon–Dunlop team. Lastly, Belgian Romain Maes took the lead in the first stage of the 1935 tour, and never gave it away. Similarly, there have been four tours in which a racer has taken over the GC lead on the second stage and held the lead all the way to Paris. After dominating the ITT during Stage 1B of the 1961 Tour de France Jacques Anquetil held the Maillot Jaune from the first day all the way to Paris.

René Pottier, Roger Lapébie, Sylvère Maes, Fausto Coppi and Bradley Wiggins all won the Tour de France the last time they appeared in the race.

Appearances
Between 1920 and 1985, Jules Deloffre (1885 – 1963) was the record holder for the highest number of Tour de France participations, with 14, and was sole holder of this record until 1966 with the fourteenth and last participation of André Darrigade. The record for most the appearances as of 2021 is held by Sylvain Chavanel, with 18. George Hincapie had held the mark for the most consecutive finishes with sixteen, having completed every Tour de France that he participated in except his first one, but was disqualified in October 2012 from the 2004, 2005 and 2006 editions of the race for his use of performance-enhancing drugs. Joop Zoetemelk and Chavanel jointly hold the record for the most finishes with sixteen each, with the former having completed all 16 of the Tours that he started. Zoetemelk also held the record for the most Tour de France stages completed with 365, a tally that was surpassed when Chavanel finished Stage 18 of the 2018 edition of the Tour. Chavanel's record now stands at 369.
 Zoetemelk currently holds the record for most kilometers ridden in Tour de France history at 62,885, a record which will be difficult to break considering the shorter stage lengths in modern Tours. Of the riders on this list only Van Impe (1976) and Zoetemelk (1980) have won the race.
Riders who are still active are indicated in bold.

Smallest winning margin
In the early years of the Tour, cyclists rode individually, and were sometimes forbidden from riding together. This led to large gaps between the winner and the runner-up. Since the cyclists now tend to stay together in a peloton, the margins of the winner have become smaller, as the difference usually originates from time trials, breakaways or on mountain top finishes, or from being dropped by the peloton. In the table below, the ten smallest margins between the winner and the second placed cyclists at the end of the Tour are listed, all of them under one minute. The largest margin, by comparison, remains that of the first Tour in 1903: 2h 49m 45s between Maurice Garin and Lucien Pothier. 

Cadel Evans is on this list twice, losing the 2007 and 2008 races by less than a minute; and he is just off this list for the 2011 edition, which he won by overturning a deficit during the final time trial claiming the victory by just 1:34 over Andy Schleck. The smallest margins between first and second placed riders are as follows.

Successful breakaways
The longest successful post-war breakaway by a single rider was by Albert Bourlon in the 1947 Tour de France. It was one of seven breakaways longer than 200 km, the last being Thierry Marie's 234 km escape in 1991. Bourlon finished 16:30 ahead. This is one of the biggest time gaps but not the greatest. That record belongs to José Luis Viejo, who beat the peloton by 22:50 in the 1976 stage Montgenèvre-Manosque. He was the fourth and most recent rider to win a stage by more than 20 minutes. Another remarkable solo effort was Fons de Wolf during stage 14 of the 1984 Tour de France. He won the stage by 17:40 and actually came within a minute and a half of Tour favorite Laurent Fignon in the overall standings. He paid for his solo effort in the following stages however, and fell back in the standings thereafter.

Overall speed

The 2022 edition was the fastest Tour de France in history. Jonas Vingegaard rode 3,349,8 km in 79h 33' 20", thus realising an overall speed of 42.102 km/h (26.161 mph).

The slowest Tour de France was the edition of 1919, when Firmin Lambot's average speed was 24.1 km/h.

Stage speeds
The fastest massed-start stage was in 1999 from Laval to Blois (194.5 km), won by Mario Cipollini at 50.4 km/h (31.32 mph). The fastest stage win was by the 2013 Orica GreenEDGE team in a team time-trial. They completed the 25 km time-trial at 57.7 km/h (35.85 mph).

The fastest climb of Alpe d'Huez was by Marco Pantani in 1997 Tour de France at 23.1 km/h (14.35 mph).

Stage wins per rider 

34 riders have won 10 or more stages (including half-stages, excluding Team Time Trials). Riders who are still active are indicated in bold. Riders with the same number of stage wins are listed alphabetically.

Three riders have won 8 stages in a single year:
  (1930, in addition to seven 2nd and three 3rd places)
  (1970, 1974)
  (1976, in addition to four 2nd and two 3rd places)

Mark Cavendish has the most mass finish stage wins with 34 ahead of André Darrigade and André Leducq with 22, François Faber with 19 and Eddy Merckx with 18.

The youngest Tour de France stage winner is Fabio Battesini, who was 19 when he won stage 3 in the 1931 Tour de France. The oldest Tour de France stage winner is Pino Cerami, who won stage 9 of the 1963 edition at 41 years old.

Riders who have won in all three specialties
These riders have won mountain, sprint, and individual time trial stages in a single Tour.

Stage wins per country 

Riders representing 33 countries have won at least one stage in the Tour de France.

Detailed table

Stage towns
Some cities and towns have hosted 25 or more stage starts and finishes:

 Paris – 145 (most recent finish: 2022)
 Bordeaux – 80 (most recent: 2010)
 Pau – 73 (most recent: 2021)
 Bagnères-de-Luchon – 60 (most recent: 2018)
 Nice – 41 (most recent: 2020)
 Metz – 40 (most recent: 2012)
 Grenoble – 40 (most recent: 2020)
 Briançon – 36 (most recent: 2022)
 Marseille – 36 (most recent: 2017)
 Perpignan – 36 (most recent: 2009)
 Caen – 35 (most recent: 2006)
 Bayonne – 32 (most recent: 2003)
 Montpellier – 31 (most recent: 2016)
 Nantes – 30 (most recent: 2008)
 Belfort – 30 (most recent: 2019)
 Brest – 30 (most recent: 2021)
 L'Alpe d'Huez – 30 (most recent: 2022)
 Saint-Étienne – 27 (most recent: 2022)
 Toulouse – 27 (most recent: 2019)
 Roubaix – 26 (most recent: 2018)

See also
 Multiple winners of the Tour de France

Notes

References

Yellow jersey statistics
Cycling records and statistics
Tour de France classifications and awards